The 2016 Israeli Final Four was the concluding tournament of the 2015–16 Israeli Basketball Super League. It was the seventh Israeli Final Four, and the event is held for the first time since the 2012 edition.  Unlike previous Final Four tournaments, there would not be a third placed game.

The Event was held in the Pais Arena, in Jerusalem between 6 and 9 May 2016. The participating teams were Hapoel Jerusalem, Maccabi Tel Aviv, Hapoel Eilat, and  Maccabi Rishon LeZion.

Venue

The Pais Arena is an indoor sports arena in Jerusalem. Opened in 2014 as an open-air venue with a capacity of 11,000.

Results

Bracket

Semi-finals
All times are in Israel Summer Time.

Hapoel Jerusalem vs. Hapoel Eilat

Maccabi Tel Aviv vs. Maccabi Rishon LeZion

Final

Winning roster

References

Specific

General
IBA's official website (Hebrew)

2016 Final Four